Kristofer Thomas Hill (born in Summit, New Jersey on October 13, 1979) is an American musician, composer, singer-songwriter, guitarist, pianist, and multi percussionist.

He was raised in Maplewood, New Jersey.

He is a guest artist with Free Arts of AZ, a non-profit organization which works with vulnerable youth in Arizona through the arts, music, theater, and dance.

Discography 

Drunken Immortals "Live" – 2001
Blow Up Co-op – 2002 – Collective works from AZ Hip-Hop musicians and MC's
Collective Memory – 2002 – Farbeon
Soul Revolution – 2003 – Drunken Immortals
Foundation – 2003 – Produced by foundation
Brad B.: Drifter – 2005 – Produced by foundation
Hot Concrete – 2006 – Drunken Immortals feat. Abstract Rude and Dres
Ganesha:Music for Modern – 2006 – Kristofer T. Hill
Flamenco – 2006 – Chris Burton Jacome ensemble
Fantasy – 2007 – Sound track for Scorpius Dance Theater Production inspired by Michael Parks paintings
Pivot – 2007 – Jody Gnant and BoGeSo
David & Lisa – 2008 – Soundtrack for Scorpius Dance Theater production
A Vampire Tale- 2009 – Soundtrack for Scorpius Dance Theater production
Insects: Gone- 2009 – Hip Hop
Levanto – 2010 – Music from Ballet de Martin Gaxiola's flamenco dance production Levanto

References

External links 
 Free Arts of AZ article
 Calo Flamenco.com
 Drunken Immortals
 Joblo the Movie Network
 AZ Central
 The Paper Project
 Blu-ray
 Chris Burton Jacome
 Scorpius
 Ear Candy

Living people
1979 births
People from Maplewood, New Jersey
Musicians from Summit, New Jersey